The Ministry of Electricity, Dams, Irrigation and Water Resources is a ministry of the Government of South Sudan. The incumbent minister is David Deng Athorbei, while Rhoda David Alak serves as deputy minister.

List of Ministers of Electricity and Dams

References

Electricity and Dams
South Sudan, Electricity and Dams